World Professional Jiu-Jitsu Cup 2011 is a third annual installment of the largest Brazilian Jiu-Jitsu event in the world, with combined prize fund of one million US dollars.

Format and prizes

Gi divisions

Men’s brown/black belt 
 Absolute – $30,000 to first / $3,000 to second / $1,500 to thirds
 Weight groups – $8,000 to first / $3,000 to second / $1,500 to thirds

Men’s purple belt

Men’s white/blue belt

Female purple/brown/black belt 
 No absolute
 Weight divisions – $4,000 to first / $2,000 to second / $500 to thirds

Female white/blue belt 
 $3,000 to first / $1,500 to second

New no-gi division 
No female no-gi category.

Men’s Brown/black belt 
 Absolute – $15,000 to first place / $1,500 to second / $750 to both third places
 Weight division – $4,000 to first / $1,500 to second / $750 to both thirds

Men’s purple belt 
 $2,500 to first / $1,000 to second (no reward for thirds)

Men’s blue belt 
 $1,500 to first / $750 to second (no reward for thirds)

New ranking system 
The athletes will be ranked according to their participation at various stages of the World Professional Jiu-Jitsu Cup since 2009. The first four athletes in the ranking will go straight to the quarterfinals of the main event, while the fifth-to eighth-place competitors will go straight into the round of eight. Submissions will count for more points in the ranking, and at the end of the season, an extra 5,000 points will be rewarded the first-ranked athlete, 3,000 points to the second and 2,000 points to the third. In the coming years title-defenses will be held during the tryouts (champion versus first-ranked). The athletes are ranked as follows:

Main event rankings

Absolute 
 40 pts – 1st place
 20 pts – 2nd place
 8 pts – 3rd place

Weight divisions 
 20 pts – 1st
 10 pts – 2nd
 4 pts – 3rd

Trials rankings

Absolute 
 20 pts – 1st
 10 pts – 2nd
 4 pts – 3rd

Weight groups 
 10 pts – 1st
 5 pts – 2nd
 2 pts – 3rd

Trials

Geo zones 
 5 stars: Brazil, USA, Canada, Australia, Japan, United Kingdom, Portugal, and Sweden
 4 stars: New Zealand, Poland and South Africa
 3 stars: Korea, China, Jordan and Bahrain

Schedule 

, the trials are scheduled take place as follows:

Weight divisions in trials 
 5 stars
 White/Blue Belts: -62 kg, -68 kg, -74 kg, -80 kg, -86 kg, -92 kg, +92 kg, Open Weights (Light -74 kg and Heavy +74 kg)
 Purple Belt: -65 kg, -74 kg, -83 kg, -92 kg, +92 kg, Open Weight (Light -74 kg, Heavy +74 kg)
 Brown/Black Belt: -65 kg, -74 kg, -83 kg, -92 kg, +92 kg, Open Weight
 Female White/Blue Belts: -63 kg, +63 kg
 Female Purple/Brown/Black Belts: -63 kg, +63 kg
 4 stars
 White/Blue Belts: -62 kg, -68 kg, -74 kg, -80 kg, -86 kg, -92 kg, +92 kg, Open Weights (Light -74 kg and Heavy +74 kg)
 Purple Belt: -65 kg, -74 kg, -83 kg, -92 kg, +92 kg, Open Weight (Light -74 kg, Heavy +74 kg)
 Brown/Black Belt: -65 kg, -74 kg, -83 kg, -92 kg, +92 kg, Open Weight
 Female White/Blue/Purple/Brown/Black Belts: -63 kg, +63 kg
 3 stars
 White/Blue Belts: -62 kg, -68 kg, -74 kg, -80 kg, -86 kg, -92 kg, +92 kg, Open Weights (Light -74 kg and Heavy +74 kg)
 Purple Belt: -65 kg, -74 kg, -83 kg, -92 kg, +92 kg, Open Weight (Light -74 kg, Heavy +74 kg)

Prizes 
Winners of the trials will receive all-expense-paid trips to the main event to Abu Dhabi. Gold and silver medalists of the black belt absolute divisions will receive additional $4,000 and $1,000 respectively. The organizers calculated that the total amount paid out for the main event, qualifiers, and travel package prizes will be one million US dollars. The actual total cash amount distributed will be AED 1,000,000 or US$272,000. This is largest amount to be awarded in a Jiu-Jitsu tournament ever.

Main event 
The main event is open not only to those who qualify at the trials. Any competitor who can afford to be in Abu Dhabi on the following dates can enter to compete at the main event:
 April 8 and 9, 2011 - No-Gi Tournament
 April 14, 15 and 16, 2011 Gi Tournament.

References

External links 
 Abu Dhabi World Pro Trials - Montreal, Canada
 Abu Dhabi World Pro Trials - Natal - Rio Grande do Norte, Brazil
 Abu Dhabi World Pro Trials - Sydney, Australia
 Abu Dhabi World Pro Trials - New Jersey, USA
 Abu Dhabi World Pro Trials - Bucharest, Romania

2011
Brazilian jiu-jitsu competitions